"Boys 'Round Here" is a song written by Rhett Akins, Dallas Davidson, and Craig Wiseman and recorded by American country music artist Blake Shelton. The song is credited to "Blake Shelton with Pistol Annies and Friends", as it features myriad vocal collaborators including the Pistol Annies (Miranda Lambert, Ashley Monroe, and Angaleena Presley), along with country singer RaeLynn, all three co-writers, and Scott Hendricks, who also produced the track. It was released in 2013 as the second single from his seventh studio album, Based on a True Story... The song uses examples of a Southern lifestyle to create its lyrical narrative. "Boys 'Round Here" received mixed reception for its production style and lyrical content. It peaked at number 1 on both the Country Airplay and Canada Country charts published by Billboard.

Content
The song is a celebration of Southern life. It is in the key of A major with an approximate tempo of 84 beats per minute and a chord pattern of A-D. Its verses are largely spoken-word.

It features backing vocals from several people associated with Shelton: the Pistol Annies, a group featuring Shelton's then-wife, Miranda Lambert; RaeLynn, a contestant on The Voice, on which Shelton is a judge; co-writers Rhett Akins, Dallas Davidson and Craig Wiseman; and producer Scott Hendricks. Co-writer Craig Wiseman said that the opening line "The boys 'round here don't listen to The Beatles" came from Davidson, who made the remark after seeing Beatles memorabilia in Wiseman's office. After Davidson said the word "redneck", Wiseman decided to "[chop] it up into short pieces" to create the "red, red, red, red, red, red, redneck" heard in the opening. Of the song's theme, Wiseman said that he felt it was an example of "write what you know" despite criticism of songs which use similar Southern themes.

Shelton said of the song, "That song had me from the first, 'cause I thought about all the guys I know back in Tishamingo. None of them listened to The Beatles. They listened to Hank, or these days you'll hear Jason Aldean blaring out of somebody's car coming from a mile away. It's just how they are, and that song is just written exactly how I live."

History
In June 2013, a Celebrity mix version premiered on BlakeShelton.com. It features Jason Aldean, Luke Bryan, Ronnie Dunn, Miranda Lambert, Reba McEntire, Brad Paisley, Josh Turner, Keith Urban and Hank Williams Jr., each of whom performs part of the "redneck" line. The Celebrity mix version was released to iTunes on June 11, 2013.

In January 2015, Shelton performed the song on Saturday Night Live.

Critical reception
Billy Dukes of Taste of Country gave the song 4.5 stars out of 5, saying that it "is intentionally silly, but score the singer significant style points for never taking his story too seriously." Giving it 4 out of 5 stars, Matt Bjorke of Roughstock compared it favorably to Shelton's previous singles "Ol' Red" and "Playboys of the Southwestern World", saying that "Boys 'Round Here" "took chances" like those songs did. He also praised the instrumentation. Sam Gazdziak of Country Universe was less favorable, saying that it was "sexist, crude and jam-packed with country stereotypes, it's an embarrassment to everyone involved".

Music video
The music video was directed by Trey Fanjoy and premiered in May 2013.

Commercial performance
"Boys 'Round Here" débuted at number 44 on the U.S. Billboard Hot Country Songs chart for the week of April 6, 2013. It peaked at number two, but was kept out of the top spot by "Cruise by Florida Georgia Line". It also debuted at number 19 on the U.S. Billboard Country Airplay chart for the week of April 13, 2013, at number 67 on the U.S. Billboard Hot 100 chart for the week of April 13, 2013 and at number 60 on the Canadian Hot 100 chart for the week of April 20, 2013.  It has sold over a million copies in the United States as of June 2013. It reached Number One on the Country Airplay chart dated June 29, 2013, becoming Shelton's ninth consecutive Number One country single, and his fourteenth overall. The song was certified 3× Platinum by the Recording Industry Association of America on May 8, 2015. , the song has sold 2,559,000 copies in the U.S. The song peaked at number 12 at the Billboard Hot 100, becoming his highest peaking song to date.

Charts and certifications

Weekly Charts

Year-end charts

Certifications

References

Blake Shelton songs
Music videos directed by Trey Fanjoy
Songs written by Dallas Davidson
Songs written by Rhett Akins
Songs written by Craig Wiseman
Song recordings produced by Scott Hendricks
Warner Records Nashville singles
2013 songs
2013 singles
Vocal collaborations